This List of Rhododendron species includes species of the genus Rhododendron, which is in the plant family Ericaceae. Depending on the source, there are anywhere from 800 to over 1,100 wild species. The vast majority of Rhododendron species are native to the eastern Himalaya and southeast Tibet, along with the islands of Java, Sumatra, Borneo, New Guinea, and the Philippines. The rest are broadly spread throughout the northern hemisphere in relatively small isolated populations, including Japan, northwestern North America, the Appalachian, and the Caucasus Mountains.

Rhododendron has eight traditionally accepted subgenera based on morphology, still the consensus taxonomy used by most authorities: Azaleastrum; Candidastrum; Hymenanthes; Mumeazalea; Pentanthera; Rhododendron; Therorhodion; Tsutsusi. Hymenanthes, with approximately 225 species, and subgenus Rhododendron, with approx. 400 species, comprise what gardeners typically describe as "Rhododendrons." Two subgenera are generally known to gardeners as "Azaleas", and include many fewer true species: Pentanthera, which comprises the deciduous azaleas, and Tsutsusi, which includes evergreen azaleas.

Modern cladistic analysis, based on nuclear genetics, proposes changes in the classification of species within subgenera. These proposals are based on at least three different studies, with no changes proposed within subgenus Rhododendron and its sections. The major proposed changes are: to make section Choniastrum (originally in subgenus Azaleastrum) a separate Choniastrum subgenus; to combine sections Ponticum, Pentanthera, and the species Rhododendron canadense in subgenus Hymenanthes; subgenus Azaleastrum to include the former subgenera Tsutsusi, Mumeazalea, Candidastrum, and Menziesa, along with former sections Viscidula, Azaleastrum, Sciadorhodion, and the species Rhododendron vaseyi.

A

Rhododendron aberconwayi Cowan
Rhododendron adamsii Rehder 
Rhododendron adenanthum M.Y. He
Rhododendron adenogynum Diels
Rhododendron adenopodum Franch.
Rhododendron adenosum Davidian
Rhododendron aganniphum Balf. f. & Kingdon-Ward
Rhododendron agastum Balf. f. & W.W. Sm.
Rhododendron albertsenianum Forrest
Rhododendron albrechtii
Rhododendron album  Blume
Rhododendron alutaceum Balf. f. & W.W. Sm.
Rhododendron amandum Cowan
Rhododendron ambiguum Hemsl.
Rhododendron amesiae Rehder & E.H. Wilson
Rhododendron amundsenianum Hand.-Mazz.
Rhododendron annae Franch.
Rhododendron anthopogon D. Don
Rhododendron anthopogonoides Maxim.
Rhododendron anthosphaerum Diels
Rhododendron aperantum Balf. f. & Kingdon-Ward
Rhododendron apricum P.C. Tam
Rhododendron araiophyllum Balf. f. & W.W. Sm.
Rhododendron arborescens (Pursh) Torr. (Sweet Azalea)
Rhododendron arboreum Sm. (Tree Rhododendron)
Rhododendron argipeplum Balf. f. & R.E. Cooper
Rhododendron argyrophyllum Franch.
Rhododendron arizelum Balf. f. & Forrest
Rhododendron asperulum Hutch. & Kingdon-Ward
Rhododendron asterochnoum Diels
Rhododendron atlanticum (Ashe) Rehder (Dwarf Azalea)
Rhododendron atropunicum H.P. Yang
Rhododendron atrovirens Franch.
Rhododendron augustinii Hemsl.
Rhododendron aureum Georgi
Rhododendron auriculatum Hemsl.
Rhododendron auritum Tagg
Rhododendron austrinum (Small) Rehder

B

Rhododendron bachii H. Lév.
Rhododendron baileyi Balf. f.
Rhododendron bainbridgeanum Tagg & Forrest
Rhododendron balangense W.P. Fang
Rhododendron balfourianum Diels
Rhododendron bamaense Z.J. Zhao
Rhododendron barbatum Wall. ex G. Don
Rhododendron barkamense D.F. Chamb.
Rhododendron basilicum Balf. f. & W.W. Sm.
Rhododendron × bathyphyllum Balf. f. & Forrest
Rhododendron beanianum Cowan
Rhododendron beesianum Diels
Rhododendron bellissimum D.F. Chamb.
Rhododendron benhallii Craven, nom. nov.
Rhododendron beyerinckianum Koord.
Rhododendron bijiangense T.L. Ming
Rhododendron bivelatum Balf. f.
Rhododendron bonvalotii Bureau & Franch.
Rhododendron boothii Nutt.
Rhododendron brachyanthum Franch.
Rhododendron brachypodum W.P. Fang & P.S. Liu
Rhododendron bracteatum Rehder & E.H. Wilson
Rhododendron brevicaudatum R.C. Fang & S.S. Chang
Rhododendron brevinerve Chun & W.P. Fang
Rhododendron breviperulatum Hayata
Rhododendron brevipetiolatum M.Y. Fang
Rhododendron bulu Hutch.
Rhododendron bureavii Franch.
Rhododendron buxifolium Low ex Hook.f.

C

Rhododendron caesium Hutch.
Rhododendron calendulaceum (Michx.) Torr. (Flame Azalea)
Rhododendron callimorphum Balf. f. & W.W. Sm.
Rhododendron calophytum Franch.
Rhododendron calostrotum Balf. f. & Kingdon-Ward
Rhododendron calvescens Balf. f. & Forrest
Rhododendron camelliiflorum Hook. f.
Rhododendron campanulatum D. Don
Rhododendron campylocarpum Hook. f.
Rhododendron campylogynum Franch.
Rhododendron canescens (Michx.) Sweet
Rhododendron canadense (L.) Britton, Sterns & Poggenb. (Rhodora)
Rhododendron capitatum Maxim.
Rhododendron carolinianum  Rehd. 
Rhododendron catacosmum Balf. f. ex Tagg
Rhododendron catawbiense Michx. (Catawba Rhododendron)
Rhododendron caucasicum Pall.
Rhododendron cavaleriei H. Lév.
Rhododendron cephalanthum Franch.
Rhododendron cerasinum Tagg
Rhododendron chamaethomsonii (Tagg) Cowan & Davidian
Rhododendron chamaezelum Balf. f. & Forrest
Rhododendron chamberlainii Craven, nom. nov.
Rhododendron championiae Hook.
Rhododendron changii (W.P. Fang) W.P. Fang
Rhododendron chapmanii (Alph. Wood) Gandhi & Zarucchi (Chapman's Rhododendron)
Rhododendron chaoanense T.C. Wu & P.C. Tam
Rhododendron charitopes Balf. f. & Farrer
Rhododendron chihsinianum Chun & W.P. Fang
Rhododendron chilanshanense Kurashige
Rhododendron chionanthum Tagg & Forrest
Rhododendron chrysocalyx H. Lév. & Vaniot
Rhododendron chrysodoron Tagg ex Hutch.
Rhododendron chunienii Chun & W.P. Fang
Rhododendron chunii W.P. Fang
Rhododendron ciliatum Hook. f.
Rhododendron ciliicalyx Franch.
Rhododendron ciliipes Hutch.
Rhododendron cinnabarinum Hook. f.
Rhododendron circinnatum Cowan & Kingdon-Ward
Rhododendron citriniflorum Balf. f. & Forrest
Rhododendron clementinae Forrest
Rhododendron codonanthum Balf. f. & Forrest
Rhododendron coelicum Balf. f. & Farrer
Rhododendron coeloneurum Diels
Rhododendron colemanii R.F. Mill
Rhododendron columbianum (Piper) Harmaja
Rhododendron comisteum Balf. f. & Forrest
Rhododendron complexum Balf. f. & W.W. Sm.
Rhododendron concinnum Hemsl.
Rhododendron coriaceum Franch.
Rhododendron coryanum Tagg & Forrest
Rhododendron crassifolium Stapf
Rhododendron crassimedium P.C. Tam
Rhododendron crassistylum M.Y. He
Rhododendron cretaceum P.C. Tam
Rhododendron crinigerum Franch.
Rhododendron cuneatum W.W. Sm.
Rhododendron cyanocarpum (Franch.) Franch. ex W.W. Sm.

D

Rhododendron dachengense G.Z. Li
Rhododendron dalhousieae Hook. f.
Rhododendron danbaense L.C. Hu
Rhododendron dasycladoides Hand.-Mazz.
Rhododendron dasypetalum Balf. f. & Forrest
Rhododendron datiandingense Z.J. Feng
Rhododendron dauricum L.
Rhododendron davidii Franch.
Rhododendron davidsonianum Rehder & E.H. Wilson
Rhododendron dawuense H.P. Yang
Rhododendron dayaoshanense L.M. Gao & D.Z. Li
Rhododendron dayiense M.Y. He
Rhododendron declivatum Ching & H.P. Yang
Rhododendron decorum Franch.
Rhododendron degronianum Carrière
Rhododendron dekatanum Cowan
Rhododendron delavayi Franch.
Rhododendron dendricola Hutch.
Rhododendron dendrocharis Franch.
Rhododendron densifolium K.M. Feng
Rhododendron denudatum H. Lév.
Rhododendron detersile Franch.
Rhododendron × detonsum Balf. f. & Forrest
Rhododendron dichroanthum Diels
Rhododendron dignabile Cowan
Rhododendron dimitrum Balf. f. & Forrest
Rhododendron × diphrocalyx Balf. f.
Rhododendron discolor Franch.
Rhododendron diversipilosum (Nakai) Harmaja
Rhododendron duclouxii H. Lév.
Rhododendron dumicola Tagg & Forrest

E

Rhododendron ebianense M.Y. Fang
Rhododendron eclecteum Balf. f. & Forrest
Rhododendron edgarianum Rehder & E.H. Wilson
Rhododendron edgeworthii Hook. f.
Rhododendron elegantulum Tagg & Forrest
Rhododendron emarginatum Hemsl. & E.H. Wilson
Rhododendron erastum Balf. f. & Forrest
Rhododendron ericoides Low ex Hook.f.
Rhododendron erosum Cowan
Rhododendron × erythrocalyx Balf. f. & Forrest
Rhododendron esetulosum Balf. f. & Forrest
Rhododendron euchroum Balf. f. & Kingdon-Ward
Rhododendron eudoxum Balf. f. & Forrest
Rhododendron eurysiphon Tagg & Forrest
Rhododendron exasperatum Tagg
Rhododendron excellens Hemsl. & E.H. Wilson

F

Rhododendron faberi Hemsl.
Rhododendron facetum Balf. f. & Kingdon-Ward
Rhododendron faithiae Chun
Rhododendron falconeri Hook.f.
Rhododendron fangchengense P.C. Tam
Rhododendron farinosum H. Lév.
Rhododendron farrerae Sweet
Rhododendron fastigiatum Franch.
Rhododendron faucium D.F. Chamb.
Rhododendron fauriei Franch.
Rhododendron feddei H. Lév.
Rhododendron ferrugineum L. (Alpenrose)
Rhododendron × fittianum Balf. f.
Rhododendron flammeum (Michx.) Sarg.
Rhododendron flavantherum Hutch. & Kingdon-Ward
Rhododendron flavidum Franch.
Rhododendron flavoflorum T.L. Ming
Rhododendron fletcherianum Davidian
Rhododendron floccigerum Franch.
Rhododendron floribundum Franch.
Rhododendron florulentum P.C. Tam
Rhododendron flosculum W.P. Fang & G.Z. Li
Rhododendron flumineum W.P. Fang & M.Y. He
Rhododendron formosanum Hemsl.
Rhododendron forrestii Balf. f. ex Diels
Rhododendron fortunei Lindl.
Rhododendron fragariiflorum Kingdon-Ward
Rhododendron fuchsiifolium H. Lév.
Rhododendron fulgens Hook. f.
Rhododendron × fulvastrum Balf. f. & Forrest
Rhododendron fulvum Balf. f. & W.W. Sm.
Rhododendron fuscipilum M.Y. He
Rhododendron fuyuanense Zeng H. Yang

G

Rhododendron galactinum Balf. f. ex Tagg
Rhododendron gannanense Z.C. Feng & X.G. Sun
Rhododendron gemmiferum M.N. Philipson & Philipson
Rhododendron genestierianum Forrest
Rhododendron glanduliferum Franch.
Rhododendron glaucophyllum Rehder
Rhododendron glischrum Balf. f. & W.W. Sm.
Rhododendron gologense C.J. Xu & Z.J. Zhao
Rhododendron gonggashanense W.K. Hu
Rhododendron gongshanense T.L. Ming
Rhododendron goodenoughii
Rhododendron goyozanense (M.Kikuchi) Craven
Rhododendron gracilentum F.Muell.
Rhododendron grande Wight
Rhododendron griersonianum Balf. f. & Forrest
Rhododendron griffithianum Wight
Rhododendron groenlandicum (Oeder) Kron & Judd (Bog Labrador tea)
Rhododendron guangnanense R.C. Fang
Rhododendron guihainianum G.Z. Li
Rhododendron guizhongense G.Z. Li
Rhododendron guizhouense M.Y. Fang

H

Rhododendron habrotrichum Balf. f. & W.W. Sm.
Rhododendron haematodes Franch.
Rhododendron hainanense Merr.
Rhododendron hanceanum Hemsl.
Rhododendron hancockii Hemsl.
Rhododendron haofui Chun & W.P. Fang
Rhododendron heizhugouense M.Y. He & L.C. Hu
Rhododendron hejiangense M.Y. He
Rhododendron heliolepis Franch.
Rhododendron × hemigymnum (Tagg & Forrest) D.F. Chamb.
Rhododendron hemitrichotum Balf. f. & Forrest
Rhododendron hemsleyanum E.H. Wilson
Rhododendron henanense W.P. Fang
Rhododendron henryi Hance
Rhododendron heteroclitum H.P. Yang
Rhododendron × hillieri Davidian
Rhododendron hippophaeoides Balf. f. & W.W. Sm.
Rhododendron hirsutipetiolatum A.L. Chang & R.C. Fang
Rhododendron hirsutum L. (hairy alpenrose)
Rhododendron hirtipes Tagg
Rhododendron hodgsonii Hook. f.
Rhododendron hoi W.P. Fang
Rhododendron hongkongense Hutch.
Rhododendron hookeri Nutt.
Rhododendron huadingense B.Y. Ding & Y.Y. Fang
Rhododendron huanum W.P. Fang
Rhododendron huguangense P.C. Tam
Rhododendron huidongense T.L. Ming
Rhododendron hunanense Chun ex P.C. Tam
Rhododendron hunnewellianum Rehder & E.H. Wilson
Rhododendron hutchinsonianum W.P. Fang
Rhododendron hylaeum Balf. f. & Farrer
Rhododendron hypenanthum Balf. f.
Rhododendron hyperythrum Hayata
Rhododendron hypoblematosum P.C. Tam
Rhododendron hypoglaucum Hemsl.
Rhododendron hypoleucum (Kom.) Harmaja

I

Rhododendron igneum Cowan
Rhododendron impeditum Balf. f. & W.W. Sm.
Rhododendron indicum (L.) Sweet
Rhododendron inopinum Balf. f.
Rhododendron insigne Hemsl. & E.H. Wilson
Rhododendron intricatum Franch.
Rhododendron invictum Balf. f. & Farrer
Rhododendron irroratum Franch.

J

Rhododendron jasminiflorum Hook.
Rhododendron jasminoides M.Y. He
Rhododendron javanicum (Blume) Benn.
Rhododendron jenestierianum Forrest
Rhododendron jinchangense Zeng H. Yang
Rhododendron jingangshanicum P.C. Tam
Rhododendron jinpingense W.P. Fang & M.Y. He
Rhododendron jinxiuense W.P. Fang & M.Y. He
Rhododendron joniense Ching & H.P. Yang

K

Rhododendron kaempferi Planch.
Rhododendron kanehirae E.H.Wilson
Rhododendron kasoense Hutch. & Kingdon-Ward
Rhododendron katsumatae (M.Tash. & H.Hatta) Craven
Rhododendron kawakamii Hayata
Rhododendron keiskei Miq.
Rhododendron keleticum Balf. f. & Forrest
Rhododendron kendrickii Nutt.
Rhododendron kesangiae D.G. Long & Rushforth
Rhododendron keysii Nutt.
Rhododendron kiangsiense W.P. Fang
Rhododendron kiusianum Makino
Rhododendron kongboense Hutch.
Rhododendron konori Becc.
Rhododendron kroniae Craven
Rhododendron kwangsiense Hu ex P.C. Tam
Rhododendron kwangtungense Merr. & Chun
Rhododendron kyawii Lace & W.W. Sm.
Rhododendron × kamatae (Mochizuki) Craven

L

Rhododendron labolengense Ching & H.P. Yang
Rhododendron lacteum Franch.
Rhododendron laetum J. J. Sm.
Rhododendron lanatoides D.F. Chamb.
Rhododendron lanatum Hook. f.
Rhododendron lanigerum Tagg
Rhododendron laojunshanense M.Y. Fang
Rhododendron lapponicum (L.) Wahlenb.
Rhododendron lasiostylum Hayata
Rhododendron lateriflorum R.C. Fang & A.L. Chang
Rhododendron latoucheae Franch.
Rhododendron laudandum Cowan
Rhododendron leiboense Z.J. Zhao
Rhododendron leishanicum W.P. Fang & S.S. Chang ex D.F. Chamb.
Rhododendron lepidostylum Balf. f. & Forrest
Rhododendron lepidotum Wall. ex G. Don
Rhododendron leptocarpum Nutt.
Rhododendron leptocladon Dop
Rhododendron leptopeplum Balf. f. & Forrest
Rhododendron leptothrium Balf. f. & Forrest
Rhododendron leucaspis Tagg
Rhododendron levinei Merr.
Rhododendron liaoxigense S.L. Tung & Z. Lu
Rhododendron liboense Z.R. Chen & K.M. Lan
Rhododendron liliiflorum H. Lév.
Rhododendron lindleyi T. Moore
Rhododendron linearilobum R.C. Fang & A.L. Chang
Rhododendron linguiense G.Z. Li
Rhododendron litchiifolium T.C. Wu & P.C. Tam
Rhododendron lochiae F. Muell. (Australian Rhododendron)
Rhododendron lochmium Balf. f.
Rhododendron loerzingii J.J. Smith
Rhododendron longesquamatum C.K. Schneid.
Rhododendron longicalyx M.Y. Fang
Rhododendron longifalcatum P.C. Tam
Rhododendron longilobum L.M. Gao & D.Z. Li
Rhododendron longiperulatum Hayata
Rhododendron longipes Rehder & E.H. Wilson
Rhododendron longistylum Rehder & A. Wilson
Rhododendron loniceriflorum P.C. Tam
Rhododendron lowii Hook.f.
Rhododendron ludlowii Cowan
Rhododendron luhuoense H.P. Yang
Rhododendron lukiangense Franch.
Rhododendron lulangense L.C. Hu & Tateishi
Rhododendron lungchiense W.P. Fang
Rhododendron lutescens Franch.
Rhododendron luteum Sweet (yellow or honeysuckle azalea)

M

Rhododendron macgregoriae F.Muell.
Rhododendron mackenzianum Forrest
Rhododendron maculiferum Franch.
Rhododendron macrophyllum D.Don ex G. Don [1834] (R. californicum Hook.f.) (Pacific Coast Rhododendron)
Rhododendron maddenii Hook. f.
Rhododendron magnificum Kingdon-Ward
Rhododendron magniflorum W.K. Hu
Rhododendron maguanense K.M. Feng
Rhododendron mainlingense S.H. Huang & R.C. Fang
Rhododendron malipoense M.Y. He
Rhododendron mallotum Balf. f. & Kingdon-Ward
Rhododendron maoerense W.P. Fang & G.Z. Li
Rhododendron maowenense Ching & H.P. Yang
Rhododendron mariae Hance
Rhododendron mariesii Hemsl. & E.H. Wilson
Rhododendron martinianum Balf. f. & Forrest
Rhododendron maximum L. (great or American Rhododendron)
Rhododendron meagaii  Mambrasar & Hutabarat
Rhododendron meddianum Forrest
Rhododendron medoense W.P. Fang & M.Y. He
Rhododendron megacalyx Balf. f. & Kingdon-Ward
Rhododendron megalanthum M.Y. Fang
Rhododendron megeratum Balf. f. & Forrest
Rhododendron mekongense Franch.
Rhododendron mengtszense Balf. f. & W.W. Sm.
Rhododendron menziesii Craven
Rhododendron meridionale P.C. Tam
Rhododendron mianningense Z.J. Zhao
Rhododendron micranthum Turcz.
Rhododendron microgynum Balf. f. & Forrest
Rhododendron microphyton Franch.
Rhododendron mimetes Tagg & Forrest
Rhododendron miniatum Cowan
Rhododendron minus Michx. 
Rhododendron minutiflorum Hu
Rhododendron minyaense Philipson & M.N. Philipson
Rhododendron mitriforme P.C. Tam
Rhododendron miyiense W.K. Hu
Rhododendron molle (Blume) G. Don
Rhododendron mollicomum Balf. f. & W.W. Sm.
Rhododendron monanthum Balf. f. & W.W. Sm.
Rhododendron montiganum T.L. Ming
Rhododendron montroseanum Davidian
Rhododendron morii Hayata
Rhododendron moulmainense Hook. (Westland's Rhododendron)
Rhododendron moupinense Franch.
Rhododendron mucronatum (Blume) G. Don
Rhododendron mucronulatum Turcz.
Rhododendron multiflorum (Maxim.) Craven
Rhododendron myrsinifolium Ching ex W.P. Fang & M.Y. He
Rhododendron myrtifolium Schott & Kotschy

N

Rhododendron naamkwanense Merr.
Rhododendron nakaharae Hayata
Rhododendron nakotiltum Balf. f. & Forrest
Rhododendron nanjianense K.M. Feng & Z.H. Yang
Rhododendron nanpingense P.C. Tam
Rhododendron neglectum (Ashe) Ashe
Rhododendron neoglandulosum Harmaja formerly Ledum glandulosum (western Labrador tea, or trapper's tea)
Rhododendron neriiflorum Franch.
Rhododendron nigroglandulosum Nitz.
Rhododendron nitidulum Rehder & E.H. Wilson
Rhododendron nivale Hook. f.
Rhododendron niveum Hook. f.
Rhododendron noriakianum Suzuki
Rhododendron nuttallii Booth ex Nutt.
Rhododendron nyingchiense R.C. Fang & S.H. Huang
Rhododendron nymphaeoides W.K. Hu

O

Rhododendron oblancifolium M.Y. Fang
Rhododendron oblongifolium (Small) Millais
Rhododendron obtusum (Lindl.) Planch.
Rhododendron occidentale (Torr. & A. Gray) A. Gray
Rhododendron ochraceum Rehder & E.H. Wilson
Rhododendron octandrum M.Y. He
Rhododendron oldhamii Maxim.
Rhododendron oligocarpum W.P. Fang
Rhododendron orbiculare Decne.
Rhododendron oreodoxa Franch.
Rhododendron oreogenum L.C. Hu
Rhododendron oreotrephes W.W. Sm.
Rhododendron orthocladum Balf. f. & Forrest
Rhododendron ovatum (Lindl.) Planch. ex Maxim.

P

Rhododendron pachyphyllum W.P. Fang
Rhododendron pachypodum Balf. f. & W.W. Sm.
Rhododendron pachysanthum Hayata
Rhododendron pachytrichum Franch.
Rhododendron papillatum Balf. f. & R.E. Cooper
Rhododendron paradoxum Balf. f.
Rhododendron parmulatum Cowan
Rhododendron pemakoense Kingdon-Ward
Rhododendron pendulum Hook. f.
Rhododendron pentaphyllum
Rhododendron pentandrum (Maxim.) Craven
Rhododendron peregrinum Tagg
Rhododendron periclymenoides (Michx.) Shinners (pinxterflower)
Rhododendron petrocharis Diels
Rhododendron phaeochrysum Balf. f. & W.W. Sm.
Rhododendron piercei Davidian
Rhododendron pilosum (Michx. ex Lam.) Craven
Rhododendron pilostylum W.K. Hu
Rhododendron pinetorum P.C. Tam
Rhododendron pingbianense M.Y. Fang
Rhododendron pingianum W.P. Fang
Rhododendron platyphyllum (Franch. ex Diels) Balf. f. & W.W. Sm.
Rhododendron platypodum Diels
Rhododendron pleistanthum E.H. Wilding
Rhododendron pocophorum Balf. f. ex Tagg
Rhododendron poilanei Dop
Rhododendron polycladum Franch.
Rhododendron polylepis Franch.
Rhododendron polyraphidoideum P.C. Tam
Rhododendron polytrichum W.P. Fang
Rhododendron pomense Cowan & Davidian
Rhododendron ponticum L. 
Rhododendron populare Cowan
Rhododendron potaninii Batalin
Rhododendron praestans Balf. f. & W.W. Sm.
Rhododendron praeteritum Hutch.
Rhododendron praevernum Hutch.
Rhododendron preptum Balf. f. & Forrest
Rhododendron primuliflorum Bureau & Franch.
Rhododendron principis Bureau & Franch.
Rhododendron prinophyllum (Small) Millais
Rhododendron pronum Tagg & Forrest
Rhododendron proteoides Balf. f. & W.W. Sm.
Rhododendron protistum Balf. f. & Forrest
Rhododendron pruniflorum Hutch. & Kingdon-Ward
Rhododendron prunifolium (Small) Millais
Rhododendron przewalskii Maxim.
Rhododendron pseudochrysanthum Hayata
Rhododendron pseudociliipes Cullen
Rhododendron pubescens Balf. f. & Forrest
Rhododendron pubicostatum T.L. Ming
Rhododendron pudorosum Cowan
Rhododendron pugeense L.C. Hu
Rhododendron pulchroides Chun & W.P. Fang
Rhododendron pulchrum Sweet
Rhododendron pumilum Hook. f.
Rhododendron punctifolium L.C. Hu
Rhododendron purdomii Rehder & E.H. Wilson
Rhododendron × pyrrhoanthum Balf. f.

Q

Rhododendron qianyangense M.Y. He
Rhododendron qinghaiense Ching ex W.Y. Wang
Rhododendron quinquefolium

R

Rhododendron racemosum Franch.
Rhododendron radendum W.P. Fang
Rhododendron ramipilosum T.L. Ming
Rhododendron ramsdenianum Cowan
Rhododendron rarilepidotum J.J.Sm.
Rhododendron rarum Schltr.
Rhododendron recurvoides Tagg & Kingdon-Ward
Rhododendron redowskianum Maxim.
Rhododendron retusum (Blume) Benn.
Rhododendron rex H. Lév.
Rhododendron rhodanthum M.Y. He
Rhododendron rhombifolium R.C. Fang
Rhododendron rhuyuenense Chun ex P.C. Tam
Rhododendron rigidum Franch.
Rhododendron riparioides (Cullen) Cubey
Rhododendron ririei Hemsl. & E.H. Wilson
Rhododendron rivulare Hand.-Mazz.
Rhododendron roseatum Hutch.
Rhododendron rothschildii Davidian
Rhododendron roxieanum Forrest
Rhododendron roxieoides D.F. Chamb.
Rhododendron rubiginosum Franch.
Rhododendron rubropilosum Hayata
Rhododendron rufescens Franch.
Rhododendron rufohirtum Hand.-Mazz.
Rhododendron rufum Batalin
Rhododendron rupicola W.W. Sm.
Rhododendron rupivalleculatum P.C. Tam
Rhododendron rushforthii Argent & D.F. Chamb.
Rhododendron russatum Balf. f. & Forrest

S

Rhododendron saluenense Franch.
Rhododendron sanguineum Franch.
Rhododendron sargentianum Rehder & E.H. Wilson
Rhododendron saxatile B.Y. Ding & Y.Y. Fang
Rhododendron scabrifolium Franch.
Rhododendron schistocalyx Balf. f. & Forrest
Rhododendron schlippenbachii Maxim.
Rhododendron scopulorum Hutch.
Rhododendron searsiae Rehder & E.H. Wilson
Rhododendron seinghkuense Kingdon-Ward
Rhododendron selense Franch.
Rhododendron semnoides Tagg & Forrest
Rhododendron seniavinii Maxim.
Rhododendron serotinum Hutch.
Rhododendron setiferum Balf. f. & Forrest
Rhododendron setosum D. Don
Rhododendron shanii W.P. Fang
Rhododendron sherriffii Cowan
Rhododendron shimenense Q.X. Liu & C.M. Zhang
Rhododendron shimianense W.P. Fang & P.S. Liu
Rhododendron shweliense Balf. f. & Forrest
Rhododendron sidereum Balf. f.
Rhododendron siderophyllum Franch.
Rhododendron sikangense W.P. Fang
Rhododendron sikayotaizanense Masam.
Rhododendron simiarum Hance
Rhododendron simsii Planch.
Rhododendron sinofalconeri Balf. f.
Rhododendron sinogrande Balf. f. & W.W. Sm.
Rhododendron sinonuttallii Balf. f. & Forrest
Rhododendron × sinosimulans D.F. Chamb.
Rhododendron smirnowii Trautv.
Rhododendron sophistarum Craven
Rhododendron souliei Franch.
Rhododendron spadiceum P.C. Tam
Rhododendron spanotrichum Balf. f. & W.W. Sm.
Rhododendron sparsifolium W.P. Fang
Rhododendron sperabile Balf. f. & Farrer
Rhododendron sperabiloides Tagg & Forrest
Rhododendron sphaeroblastum Balf. f. & Forrest
Rhododendron spiciferum Franch.
Rhododendron spinuliferum Franch.
Rhododendron stamineum Franch.
Rhododendron stewartianum Diels
Rhododendron strigillosum Franch.
Rhododendron strigosum R.L. Liu
Rhododendron subcerinum P.C. Tam
Rhododendron subenerve P.C. Tam
Rhododendron subestipitatum Chun ex P.C. Tam
Rhododendron subflumineum P.C. Tam
Rhododendron subansiriense Chamberlain
Rhododendron subulatum (Nakai) Harmaja
Rhododendron sulfureum Franch.
Rhododendron sutchuenense Franch.

T

Rhododendron taggianum Hutch.
Rhododendron taibaiense Ching & H.P. Yang
Rhododendron taichungianum S.S. Ying
Rhododendron taipaoense T.C. Wu & P.C. Tam
Rhododendron taishunense B.Y. Ding & Y.Y. Fang
Rhododendron taiwanalpinum Ohwi
Rhododendron taliense Franch.
Rhododendron tanastylum Balf. f. & Kingdon-Ward
Rhododendron tapetiforme Balf. f. & Kingdon-Ward
Rhododendron taronense Hutch.
Rhododendron tashiroi Maxim.
Rhododendron tatsienense Franch.
Rhododendron telmateium Balf. f. & W.W. Sm.
Rhododendron temenium Balf. f. & Forrest
Rhododendron tenue Ching ex W.P. Fang & M.Y. He
Rhododendron tenuifolium R.C. Fang & S.H. Huang
Rhododendron tenuilaminare P.C. Tam
Rhododendron tephropeplum Balf. f. & Forrest
Rhododendron thayerianum Rehder & E.H. Wilson
Rhododendron thomsonii Hook. f.
Rhododendron thymifolium Maxim.
Rhododendron tianlinense P.C. Tam
Rhododendron tiantangense G.Z. Li
Rhododendron tingwuense P.C. Tam
Rhododendron tomentosum Harmaja formerly Ledum palustre (northern Labrador tea)
Rhododendron torquescens D.F. Chamb.
Rhododendron traillianum Forrest & W.W. Sm.
Rhododendron trichanthum Rehder
Rhododendron trichocladum Franch.
Rhododendron trichogynum L.C. Hu
Rhododendron trichophorum Balf. f.
Rhododendron trichostomum Franch.
Rhododendron triflorum Hook. f.
Rhododendron trilectorum Cowan
Rhododendron truncatovarium L.M. Gao & D.Z. Li
Rhododendron tsaii W.P. Fang
Rhododendron tsariense Cowan
Rhododendron tsinlingense W.P. Fang ex J.Q. Fu
Rhododendron tsoi Merr.
Rhododendron tubiforme (Cowan & Davidian) Davidian
Rhododendron tubulosum Ching ex W.Y. Wang
Rhododendron tutcherae Hemsl. & E.H. Wilson

U

Rhododendron unciferum P.C. Tam
Rhododendron uniflorum Hutch. & Kingdon-Ward
Rhododendron urophyllum W.P. Fang
Rhododendron uvariifolium Diels

V

Rhododendron vaccinioides Hook.
Rhododendron valentinianum Forrest ex Hutch.
Rhododendron vaniotii H. Lév.
Rhododendron vaseyi A.Gray
Rhododendron veitchianum Hook.
Rhododendron vellereum Hutch. ex Tagg
Rhododendron venator Tagg
Rhododendron vernicosum Franch.
Rhododendron verruciferum W.K. Hu
Rhododendron verruculosum Rehder & E.H. Wilson
Rhododendron vesiculiferum Tagg
Rhododendron vialii Delavay & Franch.
Rhododendron virgatum Hook. f.
Rhododendron viridescens Hutch.
Rhododendron viscidifolium Davidian
Rhododendron viscidum C.Z. Guo & Z.H. Liu
Rhododendron viscigemmatum P.C. Tam
Rhododendron viscosum (L.) Torr.

W

Rhododendron wadanum Makino
Rhododendron wallichii Hook. f.
Rhododendron walongense Kingdon-Ward
Rhododendron wardii W.W. Sm.
Rhododendron wattii Cowan
Rhododendron watsonii Hemsl. & E.H. Wilson
Rhododendron websterianum Rehder & E.H. Wilson
Rhododendron westlandii Hemsl.
Rhododendron weyrichii Maxim.
Rhododendron wightii Hook. f.
Rhododendron wilhelminae Hochr.
Rhododendron williamsianum Rehder & E.H. Wilson
Rhododendron wiltonii Hemsl. & E.H. Wilson
Rhododendron wolongense W.K. Hu
Rhododendron wongii Hemsl. & E.H. Wilson
Rhododendron wrayi King & Gamble
Rhododendron wumingense W.P. Fang

X

Rhododendron xanthanthum (Tagg & Forrest) D.F. Chamb.
Rhododendron xanthocodon Hutch.
Rhododendron xanthostephanum Merr.
Rhododendron xiaoxidongense W.K. Hu
Rhododendron xichangense Z.J. Zhao
Rhododendron xiguense Ching & H.P. Yang

Y

Rhododendron yakushimense (M.Tash. & H.Hatta) Craven
Rhododendron yangmingshanense P.C. Tam
Rhododendron yaogangxianense Qi-xian Liu
Rhododendron yaoshanense L.M. Gao & S.D. Zhang
Rhododendron yaoshanicum W.P. Fang & M.Y. He
Rhododendron yedoense Maxim.
Rhododendron yizhangense Qi-xian Liu
Rhododendron yuefengense G.Z. Li
Rhododendron yungchangense Cullen
Rhododendron yungningense Balf. f. ex Hutch.
Rhododendron yunnanense Franch.
Rhododendron yushuense Z.J. Zhao

Z

Rhododendron zaleucum Balf. f. & W.W. Sm.
Rhododendron zekoense Y.D. Sun & Z.J. Zhao
Rhododendron zhangjiajieense C.L. Peng & L.H. Yan
Rhododendron zheguense Ching & H.P. Yang
Rhododendron zhongdianense L.C. Hu
Rhododendron ziyuanense P.C. Tam

References

External links

 Edinburgh Rhododendron Monographs Comprehensive listing and description of all described Rhododendron species
 American Rhododendron Society
 Rhododendrons – Species and cultivars from Rododendron.cz project
 Danish Rhododendron Society

Rhododendron
Rhododendron